Belknap may refer to:

Places

United States
Belknap, Illinois, a village
Belknap, Indiana, an unincorporated community
Belknap, Louisville, Kentucky, a neighborhood
Belknap, Montana, a census-designated place
Belknap, Rhode Island, a village
Belknap, Texas, a ghost town
Belknap County, New Hampshire
Belknap Mountains
Belknap Mountain
Belknap Crater, a volcanic feature in Oregon
Belknap Hill, in Grand Rapids, Michigan
Belknap Springs, Oregon
Belknap Township, Pottawattamie County, Iowa
Belknap Township, Michigan
Fort Belknap Indian Reservation, Montana

Antarctica
Belknap Nunatak, Ellsworth Land

American structures on the National Register of Historic Places
Fort Belknap (Texas), built in 1851 to protect the Texas frontier against raids by the Kiowa and Comanche
Belknap School, Belknap, Rhode Island, a former schoolhouse
Belknap House, Carson City, Nevada
Belknap Stone House, Newburgh, New York
Belknap Bridge, Oregon

In the military
, more than one United States Navy ship
Belknap-class cruiser, a class of United States Navy guided missile cruisers built during the 1960s
Camp Belknap (military camp), a Mexican–American War camp in Texas
Fort Belknap (Texas), built in 1851 to protect the Texas frontier against raids by the Kiowa and Comanche

People
Belknap (surname), people with the surname Belknap

Other uses
Camp Belknap, a summer camp on Lake Winnipesaukee, New Hampshire
Belknap Hardware and Manufacturing Company, a former leading American manufacturer of hardware goods and major wholesaler
Belknap Press, an imprint owned by Harvard University Press
Belknap Campus, the main campus of the University of Louisville

See also
Gen. William Worth Belknap House, Keokuk, Iowa, on the National Register of Historic Places
Belnap Family Organization, a non-profit organization primarily involved in genealogy